The Tracuit Hut is a mountain hut of the Swiss Alpine Club, located above Zinal in the canton of Valais.

The Tracuit Hut is the starting point for the ascents of Bishorn, Weisshorn and Les Diablons. The hut, lying on a ridge, is accessible to hikers by a trail from the west slopes. The Turtmann Glacier lies on the east side.

See also
List of buildings and structures above 3000 m in Switzerland

References
Swisstopo topographic maps

External links
Official website (French)
The Tracuit Hut on Mount Wiki

Mountain huts in Switzerland
Mountain huts in the Alps